Kong Guoxian (born 6 September 1965) is a Chinese former football goalkeeper who played for Guangzhou Apollo throughout his entire career while internationally he represented China in the 1988 Olympics and 1988 Asian Cup. Since retiring he would go into goalkeeping coaching before becoming a football ambassador to Guangzhou in 2002 while also going on to become a private businessman.

Biography
Kong Guoxian started his football career playing for the Guangzhou youth team before being promoted to the senior team where he was called up to the squad that won the football at the 1987 National Games of China. After the tournament win Kong would soon be called up to squad that took part in the 1988 Olympics and the 1988 Asian Cup where he was second choice goalkeeper in both competitions. When he returned to club football he was unable to replicate the performances that saw him first called up to the national team and he would be part of the team that was relegated at the end of the 1989 league season. His time within the second tier did not last long and after only one season Guangzhou quickly won back promotion and for the next several seasons Kong would ensure that the club remained in the top tier. By 1999 Kong would retire and take up the goalkeeping coaching position before becoming a football ambassador to Guangzhou in 2002 while also going on to become a private businessman and football pundit.

References

External links
Team China Stats

1965 births
Living people
Chinese footballers
Footballers from Guangzhou
China international footballers
1988 AFC Asian Cup players
Olympic footballers of China
Footballers at the 1988 Summer Olympics
Guangzhou F.C. players

Association football goalkeepers